The Ivory Coast women's national under-16 basketball team is a national basketball team of the Ivory Coast, administered by the Fédération Ivoirienne de Basket-Ball.
It represents the country in international women's under-16 (under age 16) basketball competitions.

See also
Ivory Coast women's national basketball team
Ivory Coast women's national under-19 basketball team
Ivory Coast men's national under-16 basketball team

References

External links
Archived records of Ivory Coast team participations

Ivory Coast women's national basketball team
Women's national under-16 basketball teams